The following musical events and releases that happened in 2020 in Canada.

Events
 April 4 – 15th Canadian Folk Music Awards are announced online following the cancellation of the ceremony due to the COVID-19 pandemic
 May – Prism Prize
 June 15 – Preliminary longlist for the 2020 Polaris Music Prize is announced
 June 29 – Juno Awards of 2020 are announced online following the cancellation of the original March 15 ceremony due to the COVID-19 pandemic
 July – Shortlist for the Polaris Music Prize announced
 August 5 – SOCAN Songwriting Prize winners announced
 October 19 – Backxwash wins the 2020 Polaris Music Prize for the album God Has Nothing to Do With This Leave Him Out of It.
 November 1 - 42nd Felix Awards

Albums released

#
2Frères, À tous les vents
88Glam, New Mania - June 26

A
Allie X, Cape God - February 21
Don Amero, The Next Chapter - September 25
Ammoye, I Am Love
Tafari Anthony, The Way You See Me
Arkells, Campfire Chords - August 20
Tenille Arts, Love, Heartbreak, & Everything in Between - January 10
Aquakultre, Legacy - May 8
Aquakultre and Uncle Fester, Bleeding Gums Murphy - October 9 
Art of Time Ensemble, Ain't Got Long
Rich Aucoin, United States - September 18
Austra, Hirudin - May 1

B
Backxwash, God Has Nothing to Do With This Leave Him Out of It
Badge Époque Ensemble, Self-Help
Bahamas, Sad Hunk - October 9
Jason Bajada, Elizabeth
Tim Baker, Survivors - July 10
Jill Barber, Entre nous
Gary Beals, Bleed My Truth - October 23
Daniel Bélanger, Travelling - October 2
Belinda (Lisa LeBlanc), It's Not a Game, It's a Lifestyle
Beòlach, All Hands
Beyries, Encounter
Laila Biali, Out of Dust
Justin Bieber, Changes - February 14
Billy Talent, TBA
The Birthday Massacre, Diamonds - March 27
Forest Blakk, Sideways
Bob Moses, Desire (EP) - August 28
Will Bonness, Change of Plans
Born Ruffians, JUICE - April 3
Braids, Shadow Offering - June 19
Dean Brody, Boys - November 18
Bruce Peninsula, No Earthly Sound - April 17
Roxane Bruneau, Acrophobie
Basia Bulat, Are You in Love? - March 27

C
Shawna Cain, The Way
Lou Canon, Audomatic Body
Caribou, Suddenly - February 28
Carys, To Anyone Like Me
Casey MQ, babycasey
Jennifer Castle, Monarch Season - October 16
Cindy Lee, What's Tonight to Eternity
Cindy Lee, Cat o' Nine Tails
Clairmont the Second, It's Not How It Sounds - July 10
Classified, Time - September 25
Louis-Jean Cormier, Quand la nuit tombe
Rose Cousins, Bravado - February 21
CRi, Juvenile
Crown Lands, Crown Lands
Crown Lands, Wayward Flyers Vol. 1

D
The Darcys, Fear & Loneliness - November 13
Sophie Day, Clémence
The Dears, Lovers Rock - May 15
Helena Deland, Someone New - October 16
Destroyer, Have We Met - January 31
Dizzy, The Sun and Her Scorch
Dog Day, Present
Gord Downie, Away Is Mine - October 16
Alan Doyle, Rough Side Out - February 14
Drake, Dark Lane Demo Tapes - May 1
Dvsn, A Muse in Her Feelings - April 17

E
Fred Eaglesmith and Tif Ginn, Alive
Jade Eagleson, Jade Eagleson - July 24
Kathleen Edwards, Total Freedom - August 14
Elephant Stone, Hollow - February 14
Lindsay Ell, Heart Theory - August 14
Elliott Brood, Keeper - September 18
Emanuel, Alt Therapy Session 1: Disillusion (June); Alt Therapy Session 2: Transformation (December)
Eric Ethridge, Good with Me - October 30
Evening Hymns, Heavy Nights - June 26

F
Fast Romantics, Pick It Up
Luca Fogale, Nothing Is Lost
FouKi, Grignotines de luxe
FouKi and Koriass, Génies en herbe
The Franklin Electric, In Your Head/In Your Heart

G
The Garrys, Haxan
Hannah Georgas, All That Emotion
Matthew Good, Moving Walls - February 21
Grandson, Death of an Optimist - December 4
Great Lake Swimmers, When Last We Shook Hands: Cover Songs, Vol. 1
Great Lake Swimmers, Live in Ottawa at the 27 Club, October 3, 2019
Grimes, Miss Anthropocene - February 21
Matthew Grimson, Prize for Writing

H
Half Moon Run, The Covideo Sessions 
Half Moon Run, Seasons of Change
Harm & Ease, Midnight Crisis
Sarah Harmer, Are You Gone - February 21
High Valley, Grew Up On That - May 8
Matt Holubowski, Weird Ones
Holy Fuck, Deleter - January 17
Andrew Hyatt, Neverland

J
Sammy Jackson, With You
David James, If I Were You - March 13
Ryland James, Ryland James
Ryland James, A Little Christmas
Japandroids, Massey Fucking Hall - June 19
Yves Jarvis, Sundry Rock Song Stock - September 25
Carly Rae Jepsen, Dedicated Side B - May 21
The Jerry Cans, Echoes - May 15
Berk Jodoin, Berk Jodoin
July Talk, Pray for It - July 10
Junia-T, Studio Monk

K
K-Anthony, The Cure
Peter Katz, City of Our Lives
Brett Kissel, Now or Never - January 1
Kiwi Jr., Football Money
k-os, Boshido - May 29
Krief, Chemical Trance - August 14

L
Matt Lang, More - June 5
Land of Talk, Indistinct Conversations
Jessy Lanza, All the Time - July 24
Laurence-Anne, Accident
Shay Lia, Solaris - September 25
Gordon Lightfoot, Solo - March 20
Loony, JOYRiDE
Loud Luxury, Nights Like This - March 27
Corb Lund, Agricultural Tragic - July 26

M
Catherine Major, Carte mère
Dan Mangan, Thief - November 20
Cory Marks, Who I Am - August 7
Matthew Tavares & Leland Whitty, Visions - March 20
Matt Mays, Dog City - August 28
 Shawn Mendes, Wonder - December 4
 Tyler Joe Miller, Sometimes I Don't, But Sometimes I Do - November 6
Ryland Moranz, XO, 1945
Alanis Morissette, Such Pretty Forks in the Road - July 31
MSTRKRFT, Black Gloves - October 30
David Myles, Leave Tonight - May 8

O
The OBGMs, The Ends - October 30
Ocie Elliott, In That Room; Tracks 
Odario, Good Morning Hunter - October 23

P
The Pack A.D., It Was Fun While It Lasted
Partner, Never Give Up - November 20
PartyNextDoor, Partymobile - March 27
PartyNextDoor, Partypack - October 16
Orville Peck, Show Pony EP
Klô Pelgag, Notre-Dame-des-Sept-Douleurs
Philémon Cimon, Philédouche
Lido Pimienta, Miss Colombia
Dany Placard, J'connais rien à l'astronomie
Plants and Animals, The Jungle
Joel Plaskett, 44 - April 17
MacKenzie Porter, Drinkin' Songs: The Collection - November 6
William Prince, Reliever - February 7
William Prince, Gospel First Nation - October 23
Protest the Hero, Palimpsest - June 18
P'tit Belliveau, Greatest Hits, Vol. 1
Purity Ring, Womb - April 3

Q
Quin with One N, Out of the Blue

R
Billy Raffoul, International Hotel
Allan Rayman, Christian - April 3
Savannah Ré, Opia
Regina Gently, Don't Wait to Love Me - September 18
Noah Reid, Gemini - May 28
The Reklaws, Sophomore Slump - October 16
Jessie Reyez, Before Love Came to Kill Us - March 27
Daniel Romano, Content to Point the Way
Daniel Romano, Dandelion
Daniel Romano, Forever Love's Fool
Daniel Romano, Okay Wow
Daniel Romano, Spider Bite
Daniel Romano, Super Pollen
Daniel Romano, Visions of the Higher Dream - March 17
Daniel Romano, Daniel Romano's Outfit Do (What Could Have Been) Infidels By Bob Dylan & the Plugz
Daniel Romano, White Flag
Rum Ragged, The Thing About Fish

S
Sam Roberts Band, All Of Us - October 16
Sargeant X Comrade, Magic Radio - June 20
Seaway, Big Vibe - October 16
Shabason, Krgovich and Harris, Philadelphia
Andy Shauf, The Neon Skyline - January 24
Crystal Shawanda, Church House Blues - April 17
Silverstein, A Beautiful Place to Drown - March 6
Dylan Sinclair, Proverb
Gord Sinclair, Taxi Dancers - February 28
Zal Sissokho, Kora Flamenca
Dallas Smith, Timeless - August 28
Storry, CH III: The Come Up
Storry, Interlude-19
Summersets, Small Town Saturday

T
Julian Taylor, The Ridge - June 19
Theory of a Deadman, Say Nothing - January 31
Tobi, ELEMENTS Vol. 1 - October 21

U
U.S. Girls, Heavy Light - March 6
Terry Uyarak, Nunarjua Isulinginniani - October 30

V
Mathew V, Two Faced
Vagina Witchcraft, Vagina Witchcraft
Rosie Valland, Blue
Vile Creature, Glory, Glory! Apathy Took Helm!

W
Rufus Wainwright, Unfollow the Rules - July 10
Colter Wall, Western Swing & Waltzes and Other Punchy Songs - August 28
We Are the City, RIP - January 24
Ruby Waters, If It Comes Down to It
Weaves, TBA
The Weeknd, After Hours - March 20
WHOOP-Szo, Warrior Remixes
Wild Rivers, Songs to Break Up To
JJ Wilde, Ruthless
Witch Prophet, DNA Activation - March 24
Wolf Parade, Thin Mind - January 24
Donovan Woods, Without People - November 6
Roy Woods, Dem Times - May 15
Hawksley Workman, Less Rage More Tears - October 23

Y
 Nikki Yanofsky, Turn Down the Sound - July 10
Yukon Blonde, Vindicator - November 13

Z
 Zen Bamboo, Glu
 Zoon, Bleached Wavves

Deaths
January 7 - Neil Peart, 67, drummer for Rush
February 1 - George Blondheim, 63, pianist and composer
March 7 - Laura Smith, 67, folk singer-songwriter
April 4 - Barry Allen, rock singer
May 12 - Renée Claude, 80, pop singer ("Tu trouveras la paix", "C'est toi, c'est moi, c'est lui, c'est nous autres")
June 26 - Graeme Williamson, rock singer (Pukka Orchestra).
August 10 - Salome Bey, 86, blues singer

References